Kalakka Povathu Yaaru? Champions or KPY Champions is a 2017 Indian Tamil-language reality Stand-up comedy television show, that airs on Star Vijay  and streamed on Disney+ Hotstar. Over six years, KPY Champions has rolled out three seasons. Grace Karunas, Thadi Balaji  and Ma Ka Pa Anand as the judges for the first two seasons.

This show features a great opportunity for the comedian of Tamil Nadu to showcase their comedy talent. The first season was premiered on 18 June 2017.

Overview

Season 1
The first season of KPY Champions was aired on every Sunday at 14:00 from 18 June 2017 to 27 January 2019 and ended with 84  Episodes. The show contestants are Kalakka Povathu Yaaru? Season 5 and Season 6 Teams and Siricha Pochu team.

Grace Karunas, Thadi Balaji and Ma Ka Pa Anand as the judges, Sriranjani Sundaram and VJ Pappu as the hosts. The winner of the season was Pulikesi Team, Anja Singam was the runner-up.

 Winner: Pulikesi Team
 First Runners-Up: Anja Singam

Season 2
The second Season of KPY Champions started on 11 August 2019 and finished on 2 February 2020 with 23 Episodes. Grace Karunas, Thadi Balaji and Ma Ka Pa Anand has officially once again been appointed as the judges for the second time, and Myna Nandhini was as a new judge. The show hosted was Rakshan and Manimegalai. Kalakka Povathu Yaaru? 6 Team was announced the Winner of the Kalakka Povathu Yaaru? Champions 2 and received a 4 lakhs.

 Winner: Kalakka Povathu Yaaru? 6 Team

Season 3
The third Season of KPY Champions was called Kalakka Povathu Yaaru? Champions Doubles. It was premiered on 20 February 2022 and ended on 14 August 2022 with 25 Episodes. Madurai Muthu, Robo Shankar and Archana Chandhoke as the Judges. Myna Nandhini and Erode Mahesh as the hosts. Amudhavanan and Pazhani Pattalam, Azar and TSK (announced by Sivakarthikeyan) was announced the Winner of the 'Kalakka Povathu Yaaru? Champions Doubles' and received a 4 lakhs award by Star Vijay. Sathish and Rajavelu was the runner up of the season and was awarded an amount of 2 lakhs.

 Winner: Amuthavanan and Pazhani Pattalam, Azar and TSK 
 First Runners-Up: Sathish and Rajuvelu

Contestants
 Bala and Vinoth
 Raja and Yogi
 Azar and TSK
 Amudavanan and Palani Pattalam
 Naveen and Sharath
 Sathish and Rajavelu
 Ramar and Nisha
 Adhavan and Jayachandaran

Season 4
The fourth season of KPY Champions, It is scheduled to premiere on every Sunday at 13:30 from 19 February 2023. Reshma Pasupuleti, Madurai Muthu, Dhadi Balaji, and Shrutika as the judges, KPY Bala and Aranthangi Nisha as the hosts.

References

External links
 Kalakka Povathu Yaaru? Champions at Hotstar

Star Vijay original programming
Tamil-language television shows
Tamil-language stand-up comedy television series
Tamil-language reality television series
2017 Tamil-language television series debuts
Television shows set in Tamil Nadu
2017 Tamil-language television seasons
2019 Tamil-language television seasons
2022 Tamil-language television seasons
2023 Tamil-language television seasons